Woodford is a London Underground station in the town of Woodford in the London Borough of Redbridge, East London. The station is on the Central line, between South Woodford and Buckhurst Hill stations and is in Travelcard Zone 4. The station also acts as a terminus for services via the Hainault loop.

History
The station was originally opened on 22 August 1856 as part of the Eastern Counties Railway branch from Leyton to Loughton. Further alterations were carried out by the successor company, the Great Eastern Railway, including services to Ilford via the Fairlop Loop opened between Woodford and Newbury Park in 1903. After 1923 the station came under the control of the London & North Eastern Railway until transfer to the London Passenger Transport Board (LPTB) on 14 December 1947 as part of the extension of the Central line services of the London Underground. The station acted as a terminus of the Central line, with passengers transferring to a steam shuttle onwards towards Epping, where the LNER still had local freight services running between Epping and Loughton, and continued to Stratford (Liverpool Street on Sundays) until 5 October 1970. The extension was delayed by World War II and electric services commenced as far as Loughton (and around the 'loop' to Hainault) on 21 November 1948.

As part of the electrification carried out for the transfer to the LPTB the original level crossing at the station, where Snakes Lane crossed the line, was closed and a bridge, to the south, was constructed. The original goods yard, which was closed in the late 1960s, now forms the car park.

During the planning of the Victoria line, route options included a continuation of the line from Walthamstow Central to Woodford or South Woodford stations. However, in 1961, the decision was taken to build only as far as Walthamstow Central.

The station today

The main western entrance is located off The Broadway with access to the station car park. The eastern entrance is located on Snakes Lane East. This entrance is closed after 21:00 and intercom is used to ask staff to unlock the gates at other times if necessary. The ticket office on that entrance is also no longer in use. There are three platform tracks, serving a side platform to the west of the line and an island platform to the east, with the track on the eastern side of the island platform being a south facing terminal track. Beyond this terminal track are five stabling sidings, also accessed from the south.

The station had gone through refurbishment works. The stanchions have been repainted in two-tone green with tactile strips work completed. Extensive PA and Help Points have been added with new public address system. An 'owl' has also appeared suspended from the girder.

Services and connections
Train frequencies vary throughout the day, but generally operate every 6–11 minutes between 05:22 and 00:49 eastbound to Epping, every 11–25 minutes between 06:48 and 23:37 to Hainault (and beyond) and every 5–10 minutes between 05:24 and 23:36 westbound.

London Bus routes 275, 549 and W14 serve the station.

References

Books
 

Central line (London Underground) stations
London Underground Night Tube stations
Proposed Chelsea-Hackney Line stations
Tube stations in the London Borough of Redbridge
Former Great Eastern Railway stations
Railway stations in Great Britain opened in 1856